Paragon was launched at Medford, Massachusetts in 1813. She was commissioned (acquired her letter of marque]] and then captured later that year. 

Capture: On 14 August 1813, 's yawl (armed with a carronade), and supported by 's boats, chased a schooner for eight hours off Cape Cod, in little wind, before they captured her. The schooner was the letter-of-marque Paragon, of 157 tons burthen, 20 men, and pierced for 16 guns but carrying four, two 12-pounders and two 9-pounders. 

Paragon was under the command of Captain Warren Weston. She had been sailing from Charlestown to Boston when she was captured. Her cargo consisted of 178 bales of cotton, and 146 barrels and 34 half-barrels of rice. Her captors sent Paragon to Halifax, Nova Scotia, and the Vice admiralty court there condemned her in prize.

Citations

References
 
 
 
 

1813 ships
Ships built in Medford, Massachusetts
Age of Sail merchant ships of the United States
Captured ships